John Bowes may refer to:
John George Bowes (c. 1812–1864), Canadian politician
John Bowes (art collector) (1811–1885), English art collector and thoroughbred racehorse owner
John Bowes (steamship), 1852 steam collier, named after the art collector
John Bowes, 1st Baron Bowes (1691–1767), Lord Chancellor of Ireland
John Bowes, 9th Earl of Strathmore and Kinghorne (1737–1776), British peer
John Bowes, 10th Earl of Strathmore and Kinghorne (1769–1820), British peer
John Bowes (Australian politician) (1843–1897), New South Wales colonial politician
John Bowes (speaker) (c. 1383 – c. 1444), Speaker of the House of Commons of England, 1435
John Bowes (preacher) (1804–1874), English preacher
John Bowes (cricketer) (1918–1969), Lancashire cricket player
John Bowes (footballer) (1874–1955), English football forward

See also
John Bowe (disambiguation)
Bowes (disambiguation)

Bowes, John